This Is a Hospital is the debut album by Chicago-based punk rock band The Ghost. It was released March 5, 2002 on Some Records to generally positive reviews.

Jason D. Taylor from Allmusic described the lyrics as "scathing in their intensity yet brutally honest" and is an album which "displays much potential". He compares their  musical arrangements to post-hardcore band Thursday. Pitchfork Media's Rob Mitchum calls the album a  blend of "straightforward indie rock with some jagged     post-punk hues for a rhythmic, powerful, incisive guitar-and-bass attack", and the band "distinguish themselves with some impressive songwriting.

Track listing

References 

2002 debut albums
The Ghost (American band) albums
Albums produced by Steve Albini